Pucciniastrum americanum is a plant pathogen infecting caneberries.

References

Fungal plant pathogens and diseases
Small fruit diseases
Pucciniales
Fungi described in 1908